WildSnake is a puzzle video game inspired by Tetris. Snakes of varying colors and lengths fall from the top of the screen and slither to the bottom. The goal is to clear out the snakes by touching two of the same color. WildSnake was designed by Alexey Lysogorov and presented by Alexey Pajitnov. Game Gear and Sega Genesis versions were planned but never released.

Gameplay
When two snakes of the same color touch they disappear. Sometimes a flashing WildSnake will appear and destroy every snake of the same color it touches. There are also rare uncontrollable purple snakes that destroy everything they touch.

The game include 4 backgrounds and 7 grid types and 2 player mode.

Reception
Reviewing the Game Boy version, GamePro commented that "WildSnake clones the Tetris concept and adds a nifty graphic twist." They particularly praised the multiple gameplay modes and the way the snakes loop and twist to fill open spaces at the bottom of the playing field. They gave the Super NES version a positive reviewing as well, citing the same reasons, though they did remark that the snakes and their patterns are somewhat too small in this version.

Next Generation reviewed the SNES version of the game, rating it three stars out of five, and stated that "WildSnake [...] manages to entertain, if only as a watered-down version of the game that it so desperately strives to beat."

Notes

References

1994 video games
Cancelled Sega Genesis games
Puzzle video games
Game Boy games
Super Nintendo Entertainment System games
Blue Planet Software games
Spectrum HoloByte games
Video games about reptiles
Video games developed in Russia
Yojigen games